In playing cards, a suit is one of the categories into which the cards of a deck are divided. Most often, each card bears one of several pips (symbols) showing to which suit it belongs; the suit may alternatively or additionally be indicated by the color printed on the card. The rank for each card is determined by the number of pips on it, except on face cards. Ranking indicates which cards within a suit are better, higher or more valuable than others, whereas there is no order between the suits unless defined in the rules of a specific card game. In a single deck, there is exactly one card of any given rank in any given suit. A deck may include special cards that belong to no suit, often called jokers.

While English-speaking countries traditionally use cards with the French suits of Clubs, Spades, Hearts and Diamonds, many other countries have their own traditional suits. Much of central Europe uses German suited cards with suits of Acorns, Leaves, Hearts and Bells; Spain and parts of Italy and South America use Spanish suited cards with their suits of Swords, Batons, Cups and Coins; German Switzerland uses Swiss suited cards with Acorns, Shields, yellow Roses and Bells; and many parts of Italy use Italian suited cards which have the same suits but different patterns compared with Spanish suited cards. Asian countries such as China and Japan also have their own traditional suits. Tarot card packs have a set of distinct picture cards alongside the traditional four suits.

History
Modern Western playing cards are generally divided into two or three general suit-systems. The older Latin suits are subdivided into the Italian and Spanish suit-systems. The younger Germanic suits are subdivided into the German and Swiss suit-systems. The French suits are a derivative of the German suits but are generally considered a separate system.

Origin and development of the Latin suits

The earliest card games were trick-taking games and the invention of suits increased the level of strategy and depth in these games. A card of one suit cannot beat a card from another regardless of its rank. The concept of suits predate playing cards and can be found in Chinese dice and domino games such as Tien Gow.

Chinese money-suited cards are believed to be the oldest ancestor to the Latin suit-system. The money-suit system is based on denominations of currency: Coins, Strings of Coins, Myriads of Strings (or of coins), and Tens of Myriads. Old Chinese coins had holes in the middle to allow them to be strung together. A string of coins could easily be misinterpreted as a stick to those unfamiliar with them.

By then the Islamic world had spread into Central Asia and had contacted China, and had adopted playing cards. The Muslims renamed the suit of myriads as cups; this may have been due to seeing a Chinese character for "myriad" upside-down. The Chinese numeral character for Ten on the Tens of Myriads suit may have inspired the Muslim suit of swords. Another clue linking these Chinese, Muslim, and European cards are the ranking of certain suits. In many early Chinese games like Madiao, the suit of coins was in reverse order so that the lower ones beat the higher ones. In the Indo-Persian game of Ganjifa, half the suits were also inverted, including a suit of coins. This was also true for the European games of Tarot and Ombre. The inverting of suits had no purpose in terms of play but was an artifact from the earliest games.

These Turko-Arabic cards, called Kanjifa, used the suits coins, clubs, cups, and swords, but the clubs represented polo sticks; Europeans changed that suit, as polo was an obscure sport to them.

The Latin suits are coins, clubs, cups, and swords. They are the earliest suit-system in Europe, and were adopted from the cards imported from Mamluk Egypt and Moorish Granada in the 1370s.

There are four types of Latin suits: Italian, Spanish, Portuguese, and an extinct archaic type. The systems can be distinguished by the pips of their long suits: swords and clubs.
 Northern Italian swords are curved outward and the clubs appear to be batons. They intersect one another.
 Southern Italian and Spanish swords are straight, and the clubs appear to be knobbly cudgels. They do not cross each other (The common exception being the three of clubs).
 Portuguese pips are like the Spanish, but they intersect like Northern Italian ones. They sometimes have dragons on the aces. This system lingers on only in the Tarocco Siciliano and the Unsun Karuta of Japan.
 The archaic system is like the Northern Italian one, but the swords are curved inward so they touch each other without intersecting.
 Minchiate (a game that used a 97-card deck) used a mixed system of Italian clubs and Portuguese swords.

Despite a long history of trade with China, Japan was not introduced to playing cards until the arrival of the Portuguese in the 1540s. Early locally made cards, Karuta, were very similar to Portuguese decks. Increasing restrictions by the Tokugawa shogunate on gambling, card playing, and general foreign influence, resulted in the Hanafuda card deck that today is used most often for fishing-type games. The role of rank and suit in organizing cards became switched, so the hanafuda deck has 12 suits, each representing a month of the year, and each suit has 4 cards, most often two normal, one Ribbon and one Special (though August, November and December each differ uniquely from this convention).

Invention of German and French suits

During the 15th-century, manufacturers in German speaking lands experimented with various new suit systems to replace the Latin suits. One early deck had five suits, the Latin ones with an extra suit of shields. The Swiss-Germans developed their own suits of shields, roses, acorns, and bells around 1450. Instead of roses and shields, the Germans settled with hearts and leaves around 1460. The French derived their suits of trèfles (clovers or clubs ), carreaux (tiles or diamonds ), cœurs (hearts ), and piques (pikes or spades ) from the German suits around 1480. French suits correspond closely with German suits with the exception of the tiles with the bells but there is one early French deck that had crescents instead of tiles. The English names for the French suits of clubs and spades may simply have been carried over from the older Latin suits.

Tarot cards
Beginning around 1440 in northern Italy, some decks started to include an extra suit of (usually) 21 numbered cards known as trionfi or trumps, to play tarot card games. Always included in tarot decks is one card, the Fool or Excuse, which may be part of the trump suit depending on the game or region. These cards do not have pips or face cards like the other suits. Most tarot decks used for games come with French suits but Italian suits are still used in Piedmont, Bologna, and pockets of Switzerland. A few Sicilian towns use the Portuguese-suited Tarocco Siciliano, the only deck of its kind left in Europe.

The esoteric use of Tarot packs emerged in France in the late 18th century, since when special packs intended for divination have been produced. These typically have the suits cups, pentacles (based on the suit of coins), wands (based on the suit of batons), and swords. The trump cards and Fool of traditional card playing packs were named the Major Arcana; the remaining cards, often embellished with occult images, were the Minor Arcana. Neither term is recognised by card players.

Suits in games with traditional decks

Trumps
In a large and popular category of trick-taking games, one suit may be designated in each deal to be trump and all cards of the trump suit rank above all non-trump cards, and automatically prevail over them, losing only to a higher trump if one is played to the same trick. Non-trump suits are called plain suits.

Special suits
Some games treat one or more suits as being special or different from the others. A simple example is Spades, which uses spades as a permanent trump suit. A less simple example is Hearts, which is a kind of point trick game in which the object is to avoid taking tricks containing hearts. With typical rules for Hearts (rules vary slightly) the queen of spades and the two of clubs (sometimes also the jack of diamonds) have special effects, with the result that all four suits have different strategic value. Tarot decks have a dedicated trump suit.

Chosen suits 
Games of the Karnöffel Group have between one and four chosen suits, sometimes called selected suits or, misleadingly, trump suits. The chosen suits are typified by having a disrupted ranking and cards with varying privileges which may range from full to none and which may depend on the order they are played to the trick. For example, chosen Sevens may be unbeatable when led, but otherwise worthless. In Swedish Bräus some cards are even unplayable. In games where the number of chosen suits is less than four, the others are called unchosen suits and usually rank in their natural order.

Ranking of suits
Whist-style rules generally preclude the necessity of determining which of two cards of different suits has higher rank, because a card played on a card of a different suit either automatically wins or automatically loses depending on whether the new card is a trump. However, some card games also need to define relative suit rank. An example of this is in auction games such as bridge, where if one player wishes to bid to make some number of heart tricks and another to make the same number of diamond tricks, there must be a mechanism to determine which takes precedence in the bidding order.

There is no standard order for the four suits and so there are differing conventions among games that need a suit hierarchy. Examples of suit order are (from highest to lowest):

Only used for bidding.
Only used for bidding.

Pairing or ignoring suits
The pairing of suits is a vestigial remnant of Ganjifa, a game where half the suits were in reverse order, the lower cards beating the higher. In Ganjifa, progressive suits were called "strong" while inverted suits were called "weak". In Latin decks, the traditional division is between the long suits of swords and clubs and the round suits of cups and coins. This pairing can be seen in Ombre and Tarot card games. German and Swiss suits lack pairing but French suits maintained them and this can be seen in the game of Spoil Five.

In some games, such as blackjack, suits are ignored. In other games, such as Canasta, only the color (red or black) is relevant. In yet others, such as bridge, each of the suit pairings are distinguished.

In contract bridge, there are three ways to divide four suits into pairs: by color, by rank and by shape resulting in six possible suit combinations.
 Color is used to denote the red suits (hearts and diamonds) and the black suits (spades and clubs).
 Rank is used to indicate the major (spades and hearts) versus minor (diamonds and clubs) suits.
 Shape is used to denote the pointed (diamonds and spades, which visually have a sharp point uppermost) versus rounded (hearts and clubs) suits. This is used in bridge as a mnemonic.

Four-color suits

Some decks, while using the French suits, give each suit a different color to make the suits more distinct from each other. In bridge, such decks are known as no-revoke decks, and the most common colors are black spades, red hearts, blue diamonds and green clubs, although in the past the diamond suit usually appeared in a golden yellow-orange.  A pack occasionally used in Germany uses green spades (comparable to leaves), red hearts, yellow diamonds (comparable to bells) and black clubs (comparable to acorns). This is a compromise deck devised to allow players from East Germany (who used German suits) and West Germany (who adopted the French suits) to be comfortable with the same deck when playing tournament Skat after the German reunification.

Other suited decks

Suited-and-ranked decks
A large number of games are based around a deck in which each card has a rank and a suit (usually represented by a color), and for each suit there is exactly one card having each rank, though in many cases the deck has various special cards as well. Examples include Mü und Mehr, Lost Cities, DUO, Sticheln, Rage, Schotten Totten, UNO, Phase 10, Oh-No!, Skip-Bo, Roodles, and Rook.

Other modern decks
Decks for some games are divided into suits, but otherwise bear little relation to traditional games. An example would be the board game Taj Mahal, in which each card has one of four background colors, the rule being that all the cards played by a single player in a single round must be the same color. The selection of cards in the deck of each color is approximately the same and the player's choice of which color to use is guided by the contents of their particular hand.

In the trick-taking card game Flaschenteufel ("The Bottle Imp"), all cards are part of a single sequence ranked from 1 to 37 but split into three suits depending on its rank. players must follow the suit led, but if they are void in that suit they may play a card of another suit and this can still win the trick if its rank is high enough. For this reason every card in the deck has a different number to prevent ties. A further strategic element is introduced since one suit contains mostly low-ranking cards and another, mostly high-ranking cards.

Whereas cards in a traditional deck have two classifications—suit and rank—and each combination is represented by one card, giving for example 4 suits × 13 ranks = 52 cards, each card in a Set deck has four classifications each into one of three categories, giving a total of 3 × 3 × 3 × 3 = 81 cards. Any one of these four classifications could be considered a suit, but this is not really enlightening in terms of the structure of the game.

Uses of playing card suit symbols
Card suit symbols occur in places outside card playing:
 The four suits were famously employed by the United States' 101st Airborne Division during World War II to distinguish its four constituent regiments:
Clubs (♣) identified the 327th Glider Infantry Regiment; currently worn by the 1st Brigade Combat Team.
Diamonds (♦) identified the 501st PIR. 1st Battalion, 501st Infantry Regiment is now part of the 4th Brigade (ABN), 25th Infantry Division in Alaska; the Diamond is currently used by the 101st Combat Aviation Brigade.
Hearts (♥) identified the 502nd PIR; currently worn by the 2nd Brigade Combat Team.
Spades (♠) identified the 506th PIR; currently worn by the 4th Brigade Combat Team.

Character encodings 

In computer and other digital media, suit symbols can be represented with character encoding, notably in the ISO and Unicode standards, or with Web standard (SGML's named entity syntax):

Unicode is the most frequently used encoding standard, and suits are in the Miscellaneous Symbols Block (2600–26FF) of the Unicode.

Metaphorical uses
In some card games the card suits have a dominance order, for example: club (lowest) - diamond - heart - spade (highest). That led to in spades being used to mean more than expected, in abundance, very much.

In European games, the order is often different: diamond or bell (lowest) - heart - spade or leaf - club or acorn (highest). See, for example, the game of Bruus.

Other expressions drawn from bridge and similar games include strong suit (any area of personal strength) and to follow suit (to imitate another's actions).

See also

Hearts (card game)
Spades (card game)
Stripped deck
Five-suit bridge

Notes

References

 
Playing cards
Contract bridge